"Give the People" is the third and final single released from EPMD's third album, Business as Usual. It peaked at 28 on the Hot Rap Singles.

The song is built around a sample of the O'Jays' "Give the People What They Want".

Music video
While there was no music video for the original version, there was a music video for the remix that was released in July 1991 weeks after the single was released. The video features EPMD rapping in front of a crowd at a park. Images and archive footage of Malcolm X, Jesse Jackson, and racial injustice were featured in the music video. Redman (in his earliest appearances) and Public Enemy made cameo appearances.

Single track listing
"Give the People" (Erick & Parrish Remix)- 3:51
"Give The People" (Jeep Mix)- 5:02
"Give The People (Radio Version)- 3:30
"Manslaughter" (LP Version)- 4:36

1991 singles
EPMD songs
Songs written by Erick Sermon
1990 songs
Def Jam Recordings singles
Songs written by PMD (rapper)

pt:Give the People